Cyperus koyaliensis is a species of sedge found in Africa, having been registered in Cameroon, Ivory Coast, Guinea, Liberia, Sierra Leone, Nigeria and the Central African Republic.

The species was first formally described by the botanist Henri Chermezon in 1936.

See also
 List of Cyperus species

References

koyaliensis
Taxa named by Henri Chermezon
Plants described in 1936
Flora of Cameroon
Flora of Ivory Coast
Flora of Guinea
Flora of Liberia
Flora of Sierra Leone
Flora of Nigeria
Flora of the Central African Republic